The  (abbreviation: PRS) is a comprehensive school and one of two secondary schools, the other being King's College, The British School of Frankfurt, in Friedrichsdorf, Hesse, Germany.

The eponym is Philipp Reis (1834–1874). The school has approximately 150 teachers and 1,900 students. So the students get their  after twelve school years in total, rather than thirteen years as it was previously. This modification has been cancelled, so the students get their  after thirteen school years in total.

References

External links 

 Official website of the  

Schools in Hesse
Educational institutions established in 1836
1836 establishments in Germany